Thomas Arslan (born 16 July 1962) is a German-Turkish film director. He directed more than ten films since 1990.

Selected filmography

References

External links 

1962 births
Living people
Film directors from Lower Saxony
Mass media people from Braunschweig
German people of Turkish descent